Alnus maximowiczii, commonly known as montane alder, is a species of alder tree native to Japan, Korea, and the Russian Far East (Sakhalin, Primorye, Khabarovsk, Kuril Islands).

References

External links
Plants for a Future

Flora of the Russian Far East
Flora of Eastern Asia
maximowiczii
Plants described in 1904